This is a list of Indiana covered bridges. There are 98 historic wooden covered bridges in the U.S. state of Indiana. Fourteen of these bridges were built before 1870 and represent the most common truss styles (Burr Arch) in Indiana.

Parke County bills itself as the covered bridge capital of the world. Combined with six counties that surround it, there are 51 of Indiana’s 98 covered bridges in this small area: Parke County (32), Putnam County (9), Fountain County (3), Vermillion County (3), Montgomery County (2),  Owen County (1) and Vigo County (1). The majority, 54, are Burr Arch truss designs, while the next most common truss style is a Howe truss with 23.

One each of the older style King Post and Queen Post are located in the western part of the state; Philips Bridge, west of Rockville in Parke County and Irishman Bridge, south of Terre Haute in Vigo County, respectively. Indiana also has examples of the Long Truss and the Smith Type IV Truss. The remaining span of the Bell Ford Bridge, northwest of Seymour in Jackson County, collapsed in January 2006. It was the last standing example of a Post Truss covered bridge in the world.

List of Covered Bridges

Extant

Nonextant

Notes
 Sorting this column will result in bridges being listed in order by county.

See also

List of bridges documented by the Historic American Engineering Record in Indiana
List of bridges on the National Register of Historic Places in Indiana
World Guide to Covered Bridges

References

External links 

 Parke County Covered Bridge Capital of the World
 Indiana Historical Markers by County

 
Indiana covered bridges
Bridges, covered
Bridges, covered